Eastern Bengal may refer to:

 East Bengal, a historical territory, in the eastern part of Bengal, roughly corresponding to modern Bangladesh (while West Bengal is a state of India)
 the former Roman Catholic Diocese of Eastern Bengal